William Henry Draper (19 December 1855 – 9 August 1933) was an English hymnodist and clergyman who composed about sixty hymns. He is most famous for "All Creatures of Our God and King", his translation of "Canticle of the Sun" by Francis of Assisi.

Biography
Draper was born in Kenilworth, Warwickshire on 19 December 1855, the fifth son of Henry and Lucy Mary Draper. He attended Cheltenham College, and went up to Keble College, Oxford as an exhibitioner. He was ordained in 1880. He was then Curate of St Mary's, Shrewsbury, and became successively Vicar of Alfreton in 1883 and Vicar of the Abbey Church, Shrewsbury in 1889. In 1899, he became Rector of Adel Church, Leeds, a position he retained for twenty-one years. During the First World War, he also acted as deputy for the Professor of English Literature at the University of Leeds, who was absent on war service. In 1918, Draper was appointed as a member of the council for the revision of the Anglican communion service.

In 1919, he became Master of the Temple in London. In 1930, contending that he had spent too long in one place, he left the Temple to become Vicar of Weare, retiring in 1933 shortly before his death.

Throughout his career, he contributed hymns to periodicals such as The Guardian and the Church Monthly. He also wrote a book of Poems of the Love of England, a biography of Sir Nathan Bodington, a survey of the University extension movement in 1923, and A Picture of Religion in England in 1927. He also developed a scheme for the establishment of church lectures in the universities.

He died in Clifton, Bristol on 9 August 1933.

Personal life
Draper married Edith, daughter of the High Court judge and Liberal politician George Denman, in 1883. She died in 1884, shortly after childbirth. He then married Emilie Augusta FitzHerbert Wright in 1889, who died in 1913. In 1920, he took a third wife, Silvia Mary Richards, daughter of the Rev. G. C. Richards who was then Canon of Durham and Professor of Greek and Classical Literature in the University of Durham.

In addition to losing two wives, several of Draper's children predeceased him. One daughter, Angela Lucy, died in February 1903 in unknown circumstances, and three of his sons died in the First World War. Another daughter married the notable musician Thomas Armstrong.

Well-known hymns
 All Creatures of Our God and King
 Come Forth, Ye Sick and Poor
 From Homes of Quiet Peace
 How Blest the Land Where God Is Known
 How Fair Was the Land of God’s People of Old
 Hush, All Ye Sounds of War
 In Our Day of Thanksgiving
 Lord, Through This Holy Week of Our Salvation
 Man Shall Not Live by Bread Alone
 Rejoice, Ye Angels in the Sky
 Righteous Father, We Have Wronged Thee
 We Love God’s Acre Round the Church
 What Can I Do for England?
 Ye Sons of God, Arise

Published hymnals
 The Victoria Book of Hymns (1897)
 Hymns for Holy Week (London: H. Frowde, 1898)
 A Memorial Service for Them That Are Fallen Asleep in Christ (London: H. Frowde, 1898)
 The Way of the Cross (Oxford: A. R. Mowbray & Co.)

References

19th-century English Anglican priests
20th-century English Anglican priests
Church of England hymnwriters
1855 births
1933 deaths
People educated at Cheltenham College
Alumni of Keble College, Oxford
People from Kenilworth
English male writers
Masters of the Temple